FC Avtodor Vladikavkaz was a Russian association football club from Vladikavkaz, founded in 1983. It first played on the professional level in 1990. The highest level it ever achieved was Russian First Division where it played in 1993 and 1994. From 1992 to 1994 the club was called FC Avtodor-Olaf Vladikavkaz and in 1995 it was called FC Avtodor-BMK Vladikavkaz.

In early 2011, it failed licensing for the Russian Second Division due to high debts.

League History

Soviet Union

Russia

External links
Official website

Association football clubs established in 1983
Association football clubs disestablished in 2011
Defunct football clubs in Russia
Sport in Vladikavkaz
1983 establishments in Russia
2011 disestablishments in Russia